Maria-Carme T. Calderer (Berga, 1951) is a professor of mathematics at University of Minnesota. Her research concerns applied mathematics.

Career
Calderer received her Ph.D. from Heriot-Watt University in 1980. She was a postdoctoral researcher at the Institute for Mathematics and its Applications from 1984 to 1987, first as a postdoctoral researcher, and then as a visiting professor. She worked at Penn State from 1989 until 2001, when she joined the faculty of University of Minnesota.

Awards and honors
In 2000 Calderer received the Teresa Cohen Service Award from Penn State University.

In 2012 she became a fellow of the American Mathematical Society.

In 2022 she will become a fellow of the Association for Women in Mathematics, "For being a role model nationally and internationally due to her outstanding research contributions in the mathematics of materials; for her long record of mentoring, advising, and supervising women in applied mathematics; and for her leadership role in the mathematics community by organizing conferences, workshops, and thematic years."

Personal life
Calderer was raised in Berga, Spain. She is married to Douglas Arnold, one of her fellow professors of mathematics at University of Minnesota.

Selected publications
Bauman, Patricia; Calderer, M. Carme; Liu, Chun; Phillips, Daniel The phase transition between chiral nematic and smectic A∗ liquid crystals. Arch. Ration. Mech. Anal. 165 (2002), no. 2, 161–186.
Calderer, M. Carme; Liu, Chun Liquid crystal flow: dynamic and static configurations. SIAM J. Appl. Math. 60 (2000), no. 6, 1925–1949.

References

Living people
American women mathematicians
20th-century American mathematicians
21st-century American mathematicians
Fellows of the American Mathematical Society
Alumni of Heriot-Watt University
Pennsylvania State University faculty
University of Minnesota faculty
20th-century women mathematicians
21st-century women mathematicians
Year of birth missing (living people)
20th-century American women
21st-century American women